Eugene Burgess Crowe (January 5, 1878 – May 12, 1970) was an American businessman and politician who served five terms as a U.S. Representative from Indiana from 1931 to 1941.

Biography 
Born near Jeffersonville, Indiana, Crowe attended the rural schools and Borden (Indiana) Academy.
He taught in county schools 1894-1896.
He moved to Bedford, Indiana, in 1899 and engaged in the retail furniture business, real estate, and banking.
He served as delegate to the Democratic State conventions 1908-1960.
He served as delegate to the Democratic National Conventions in 1928, 1944, 1948, 1952, 1956, and 1960.
He served as delegate to the Interparliamentary Union Congress at Oslo, Norway, in 1939.

Congress 

Crowe was elected as a Democrat to the Seventy-second and to the four succeeding Congresses (March 4, 1931 – January 3, 1941).
He was an unsuccessful candidate for reelection in 1940 to the Seventy-seventh Congress.

Later career and death 
He resumed his former business interests.
He served as president of Stone City National Bank and Greystone Hotel.
He served as director of Wabash Fire and Casualty Insurance Co..
He remained active in business and civic affairs until his death in Indianapolis, Indiana, May 12, 1970.
He was interred in Green Hill Cemetery, Bedford, Indiana.

References

1878 births
1970 deaths
People from Jeffersonville, Indiana
Democratic Party members of the United States House of Representatives from Indiana
People from Bedford, Indiana
Businesspeople from Indiana